Schroon Lake may refer to the following:

 Schroon, New York, a town in New York
 Schroon Lake (hamlet), New York, hamlet within the town
 Schroon Lake (New York lake), a lake in New York